Jesse Joensuu (born October 5, 1987) is a Finnish professional ice hockey forward who currently plays for Ässät in the Liiga. Joensuu is the captain of Ässät for the 2022–23 season.

Playing career
Joensuu was selected 60th overall in the second round of the 2006 NHL Entry Draft by the New York Islanders. Joensuu played parts of five seasons with hometown team Ässät of the SM-liiga, starting off as a 16-year-old in 2003–04. This made him the youngest player in the history of the Finnish professional ice-hockey league.

His best season came in 2007–08, when he had 17 goals and 18 assists for 35 points, leading the team in scoring. After his season in Finland, Joensuu played one game with the Bridgeport Sound Tigers, the Islanders' American Hockey League affiliate. In the 2008–09 season Jesse played primarily with the Sound Tigers finishing fifth on Bridgeport in scoring with 39 points. On March 2, 2009, Joensuu made his NHL debut, and scored his first NHL goal, as member of the Islanders in a 4-2 victory over the Colorado Avalanche.

Joensuu began the 2010–11 season in the AHL. He played 16 games for the Islanders top affiliate, the Bridgeport Sound Tigers, before being recalled to the NHL on November 19, 2010. He made his season debut with the Islanders on November 20 in a home game in a losing cause against the Florida Panthers.

On July 1, 2011, Joensuu left the Islanders organization as a restricted free agent and signed a two-year deal with Swedish club HV71 of the Elitserien. With the intention of developing his offense as a power forward Joensuu scored 29 points in 50 games during the 2011–12 season.

Joensuu, with a clause for release from HV71 to the NHL, opted a return to the Islanders on a one-year deal on June 15, 2012. With the impending 2012–13 NHL lockout taking affect, Joensuu signed a contract for the duration of the dispute with hometown team Ässät on September 18, 2012.

On July 5, 2013, Joensuu signed as a free agent to a two-year contract to return to the NHL with the Edmonton Oilers. During the final season of his contract in 2014–15 season, and unable to secure a position on the checking lines of the struggling Oilers, Joensuu was loaned to Swiss club, SC Bern on December 12, 2014, for the remainder of the campaign.

On April 23, 2015 it was announced by Jokerit that Joensuu had signed a two-year free agent deal with the club competing in the KHL.

Following seven seasons in the Kontinental Hockey League with Jokerit, Joensuu as a free agent opted to return to his original club, Ässät of the Liiga, on 8 April 2022.

Personal life
Jesse Joensuu is the son of Finnish association football manager Jouni Joensuu.

Career statistics

Regular season and playoffs

International

References

External links

1987 births
Ässät players
Bridgeport Sound Tigers players
Edmonton Oilers players
Finnish ice hockey left wingers
HV71 players
Jokerit players
Living people
New York Islanders draft picks
New York Islanders players
Sportspeople from Pori
SC Bern players